The following is a list of programming carried by the defunct American digital cable network Nickelodeon Games and Sports for Kids (shortened to Nick GaS), which aired from 1999 until the end of 2007, when it was replaced on most systems by a 24-hour version of The N.

Former programming

Games and sports

 Double Dare (1999–2007; 1999–2009 on Dish Network)
 Double Dare 2000 (2002-2007; 2002-2009 on Dish Network)
 Family Double Dare (1999-2005)
 Super Sloppy Double Dare (1999-2005)
 Super Special Double Dare
 Figure It Out (1999–2007; 1999–2009 on Dish Network)
 Figure It Out: Family Style
 Figure It Out: Wild Style
 Finders Keepers (1999–2006)
 Gamefarm (2003–2004)
 Get the Picture (1999–2007; 1999–2009 on Dish Network)
 Global Guts (1999–2005)
 Legends of the Hidden Temple (1999–2007; 1999–2009 on Dish Network)
 Make the Grade (2000–2004)
 Maximum Rocket Power Games (2002–2003)
 Nick Arcade (1999–2007; 1999–2009 on Dish Network)
 Nickelodeon All-Star Challenge (2002–2004) 
 Nickelodeon Guts (1999–2007; 1999–2009 on Dish Network)
 Nickelodeon Robot Wars (2003–2004) 
 Play 2 Z (2003–2004)
 Scaredy Camp (2003–2005)
 SK8-TV (1999–2005)
 Splash TV (2002–2004)
 Sports Illustrated For Kids (1999)
 Think Fast (1999–2004)
 Topspin (2003) 
 What Would You Do? (1999–2005)
 Wild & Crazy Kids (1999–2005)
 You're On! (1999–2004)

Other programming

 Nickelodeon Sports Theater with Shaquille O'Neal (1999)
 Cousin Skeeter (1999-2000)
 Kenan & Kel (1999-2000)
 Nick News with Linda Ellerbee (2000; 2003; 2005) (special airings only)
 Renford Rejects (1999–2000)
 Rocket Power (2003–2005)
 Salute Your Shorts (1999; 2003–2004) 
 Speed Racer X (2004–2005)

Programming blocks
 Camp GAS (2000–2004)
 Extreme GAS (1999–2002)
 Family Fuel (1999–2002)
 Heads Up! (2001–2002)
 Pumping GAS (1999–2005)
 Wild Card (1999–2002)
 All Access GAS (1999-2000)
 Double Dare Double Play (1999-2000)

References

Nickelodeon
Nickelodeon Games and Sports